The procession for the coronation of Elizabeth II was an element of the ceremony in which court, clerical, governmental, and parliamentary officials from around the Commonwealth of Nations moved in a set order of precedence through the streets of London, England, and into Westminster Abbey, where the coronation took place.

Chaplains

Officers of the Orders of Knighthood

Standards

Members of the Royal Household

Prime Ministers of the Commonwealth of Nations

Archbishops and the Lord Chancellor

Duke of Edinburgh

Bearer of the Regalia

The Queen

References 
The London Gazette, no. 40020 of 20 November 1953, pp. 6238 ff.

Participants in procession
Elizabeth II, coronation procession participants
Participants in coronation procession
Coronation
Elizabeth II, coronation procession participants